Gordian may refer to:
Gordian I (c.159–238), Roman emperor for one month with his son
Gordian II (c.192–238), son of Gordian I, Roman emperor for one month
Gordian III (225–244), grandson of Gordian I, Roman emperor from 238 to 244
Saint Gordianus (disambiguation)
Gordian Fulde (born 1948), Australian medical doctor
Gordian Warrior, Japanese anime television series, 1979–1981
Gordianus the Finder, fictional protagonist of Steven Saylor's mystery novels set in Republican Rome
Gordian worms, a common name for Nematomorpha, a phylum of parasitic worms
Gordian, antagonist in Quiz & Dragons: Capcom Quiz Game
Gordion, capital city of ancient Phrygia
the Gordian Knot, legend of Gordion associated with Alexander the Great

See also
 Gordian Knot (disambiguation)